Brendan John Cahill (born November 28, 1963) is an American prelate of the Roman Catholic Church.  He has been serving as bishop of the Diocese of Victoria in Texas since 2015.

Early life
Brendan  Cahill was born on November 28, 1963, in Coral Gables, Florida.  He attended St. Cecilia Catholic School and graduated from St. Thomas High School in Houston, Texas.  He spent a year at Rice University before he entered St. Mary's Seminary/University of St. Thomas, both in Houston. Cahill earned a Bachelor of Psychology degree in 1985.

Priesthood
Cahill was ordained a priest by Archbishop Joseph Fiorenza for the Diocese of Galveston-Houston on May 19, 1990. That same year, he received a Master of Divinity degree from St. Thomas.

After his ordination, Cahill served as curate at St. Frances Cabrini Parish in Houston. In 1992, he was transferred to Christ the Good Shepherd Parish in Spring, Texas, serving there until 1998. Cahill received a Master of Theology degree in 1993 from Xavier University of Louisiana in New Orleans, specializing on the experience and theology of African-American Catholics.  In 1998, he joined joined the faculty of St. Mary Seminary.

In 1999, Cahill was awarded a Doctorate in Dogmatic Theology from the Pontifical Gregorian University in Rome.  He then returned to Houston to teach at St. Mary Seminary.  Cahill was appointed rector of St. Mary in 2001.  That same year, he became the director of the Secretariat for Clergy Formation and Chaplaincy Services of the archdiocese.  He speaks English, Spanish and Italian, and has a working knowledge of French and German.  Cahill also served as an associate chaplain of the Knights of Malta, of the Equestrian Order of the Holy Sepulcher, and he is a fourth degree member of the Knights of Columbus.

Bishop of Victoria
Pope Francis named Cahill as bishop of the Diocese of Victoria on April 23, 2015. He was installed and consecrated on June 29, 2015, by Cardinal Daniel DiNardo.  Archbishop Joseph Fiorenza and Bishop David Fellhauer were the co-consecrators.  The liturgy was celebrated in Our Lady of Victory Cathedral in Victoria.

On January 21, 2019, Cahill publicly named three priests from the diocese with credible accusations of sexual abuse of minors.  The investigation, run by an outside attorney covered all allegations dating back to the founding of the diocese in 1982.  One priest, David L. Collela, was retired and a second priest, Guido Miguel Quiroz Reyes, was deceased.  The third priest, Alfred Prado, had been laicized and left the country.

See also

 Catholic Church hierarchy
 Catholic Church in the United States
 Historical list of the Catholic bishops of the United States
 List of Catholic bishops of the United States
 Lists of patriarchs, archbishops, and bishops

References

External links

Roman Catholic Diocese of Victoria Official Site

Episcopal succession

 

1963 births
Living people
People from Coral Gables, Florida
University of St. Thomas (Texas) alumni
Xavier University of Louisiana alumni
Pontifical Gregorian University alumni
21st-century Roman Catholic bishops in the United States
Roman Catholic bishops of Victoria in Texas
Bishops appointed by Pope Francis
Catholics from Florida